Frank Schubert (1915–2003) was the last civilian lighthouse keeper in the United States.

Schubert began working for the United States Coast Guard in 1939. At the time of his death he was serving at the Coney Island Light in Sea Gate, Brooklyn, New York, where he had worked since 1960.   He maintained the grounds and fog signal, and was credited with saving 15 lives. Schubert remained at the lighthouse after it was automated in the 1980s, and was visited by many lighthouse buffs.

He died on December 11, 2003, aged 88.

References

External links
Coney Island Lighthouse website - maintained by the Schubert family
Lighthouse Digest article
Obituary

1915 births
2003 deaths
People from Sea Gate, Brooklyn
United States Lighthouse Service personnel